Babase Island is an island of the Feni Islands in Papua New Guinea, located east of New Ireland. It consists of a stratovolcano and a lava dome, joined by an isthmus.

References
 

Islands of Papua New Guinea
Stratovolcanoes of Papua New Guinea
New Ireland Province